Callaloo (many spelling variants, such as kallaloo, calaloo, calalloo, calaloux or callalloo)  is a popular Caribbean vegetable dish. There are many variants across the Caribbean, depending on the availability of local vegetables. The main ingredient is an indigenous leaf vegetable, traditionally either amaranth (known by many local names including callaloo), taro leaves (known by many local names, including dasheen bush, callaloo bush, callaloo, or bush) or Xanthosoma leaves (known by many names, including cocoyam and tannia).

Since the leaf vegetable used in some regions may be locally called "callaloo", "callaloo bush" or "dasheen leaves", some confusion can arise among the vegetables and with the dish itself. This, as is the case with many other Caribbean dishes, is a remnant of West African cuisine.

Etymology of callaloo and origins of the dish is contested, with similar language, with the Portuguese word caruru possibly deriving from the African word kalúlu.

Cooking variations 
Outside of the Caribbean, water spinach is occasionally used. Trinbagonians, Grenadians and Dominicans  primarily use taro/dasheen bush for callaloo, although Dominicans also use water spinach. Jamaicans, Belizeans, St. Lucians and Guyanese on the other hand use the name callaloo to refer to amaranth, and use it in a plethora of dishes and also a drink ("callaloo juice"). The "callaloo" made in Jamaica is different from the "callaloo" made in Trinidad and Tobago, Grenada and rest of the Caribbean in terms of main ingredient (the leaf used) and other ingredients included.

While Jamaicans tend to steam callaloo leaf with tomatoes, salt, peppers, onions, scallions, with or without salt fish, Trinidadians and Saint Lucians use callaloo leaves/dasheen bush, okra, coconut milk, pumpkin, onions, bell peppers, local seasonings and spices along with crabs or pigtails. "Callaloo" in Trinidad is used in a variety of dishes including callaloo soup or "oil down". Callaloo is one of the national dishes of Trinidad and Tobago and Dominica.

Plant sources for callaloo leaves

Taro, also called dasheen in the West Indies, the leaves of this root crop are used in the Trinidadian version of the dish
Tannia or malanga (Xanthosoma) also called calalu or "yautía" in Puerto Rico
Amaranth species include Amaranthus spinosus used in the West Indies; Amaranthus flavus is a yellow variety used in Brazil and known as caruru; Amaranthus viridis in Jamaica; Amaranthus tricolor in the Caribbean
Pokeweed species, Phytolacca octandra or "West Indian foxglove" (no relation to garden foxglove, genus Digitalis)
Nightshade species, Solanum americanum
Water spinach (Ipomoea aquatica; a form of morning glory)
In India (state of Andhra and Telangana) people uses leafy vegetable (Thothakura)

Callaloo recipes

Callaloo in Trinidad and Tobago and other eastern Caribbean countries is generally made with okra and dasheen or water spinach Ipomoea aquatica.  There are many variations of callaloo which may include coconut milk, crab, conch, Caribbean lobster, meats, pumpkin, chili peppers, and other seasonings such as chopped onions and garlic. The ingredients are added and simmered down to a somewhat stew-like consistency. When done, callaloo is dark green in colour and is served as a side dish which may be used as a gravy for other food.

Callaloo is widely known throughout the Caribbean and has a distinctively Caribbean origin, utilising indigenous (Xanthosoma) plants and modified with African influences, such as okra. (See palaver sauce for the West African dish.) Trinidadians have embraced this dish from their ancestors and over time have added ingredients such as coconut milk to modify its flavour. Callaloo is mostly served as a side dish; for Trinidadians, Bajans, and Grenadians it usually accompanies rice, macaroni pie, and a meat of choice. In Guyana it is made in various ways without okra.

In Jamaica, callaloo is often combined with saltfish and is usually seasoned with tomatoes, onion, scallion, Scotch bonnet peppers and margarine/cooking oil and steamed. It is often eaten with roasted breadfruit, boiled green bananas and dumplings and it is a popular breakfast dish.

In Grenada, callaloo is steamed with garlic, onion and coconut milk and often eaten as a side dish. Grenadians also stir or blend the mixture until it has a smooth consistent texture. Callaloo soup comprising callaloo, okra (optional), dumplings, ground provision like yam, potato (sweet and "Irish") chicken and beef is traditionally eaten on Saturdays. It is also one of the most important ingredients in oil down, the island's national dish comprising steamed breadfruit, callaloo, dumplings, ground provision, carrot and several varieties of meat—salt fish, chicken, and pork. All of this is steamed in coconut milk and saffron powder.

In the Virgin Islands, callaloo is served with a dish of fungee on the side.

In Guadeloupe, calalou au crabe (crab callaloo) is a traditional Easter dish.

In St. Lucia, crab callaloo is also popular especially as part of the country's Creole day celebrations.

Martinique and Guadeloupe also have a variety served with Creole rice and salt cod salad.

A similar variation is the recipe called laing which is popular in the Philippines, mainly the Bicol region.

See also
 Caruru
 Laulau, similar native dishes from Polynesia
 List of Jamaican dishes
 List of stews
 Trinidad and Tobago cuisine

References

 Davidson, Alan.  Oxford Companion to Food (1999), "Callaloo". p. 125  
 Callaloo - Volume 30, Number 1, Winter 2007, pp. 351–368 - Jamaican Versions of Callaloo

External links
 

Caribbean cuisine
Belizean cuisine
Grenadian cuisine
Guyanese cuisine
Jamaican stews
Flora of Jamaica
Plant common names
National dishes
Taro dishes
Saint Lucian cuisine
Stews
Trinidad and Tobago cuisine